Davidson C. "Dave" Nelson (1905 – April 7, 1946) was an American jazz trumpeter, pianist, and composer.

Career 
Nelson received classical training on piano and violin, but became best known in jazz as a trumpeter; he also was an arranger, having studied under Richard M. Jones. He played in Chicago with the Marie Lucas Orchestra, then worked with Ma Rainey, Jelly Roll Morton, Edgar Hayes, Jimmie Noone, and Luis Russell. A nephew and mentee of King Oliver, he officially became a member of Oliver's band in 1929, playing trumpet on his recordings for Victor from 1929 to 1931, as well as composing and arranging the pieces. He also led his own ensembles from the late 1920s; Jimmy McLin was one of his sidemen in the 1930s. 

Late in his career, he worked mostly as an arranger, and was on the staff of Lewis Publishing. He wrote and arranged pieces for Sidney Bechet, Mike Daniels, Bob Brookmeyer, Chris Barber, Lovie Austin, Kustbandet, Max Collie, Leon Redbone, Robert Schulz, Tuba Skinny, Tommy Ladnier, and others.

References
Footnotes

General references
"Dave Nelson". The New Grove Dictionary of Jazz. 2nd edition, ed. Barry Kernfeld, 2004.

American jazz trumpeters
American male trumpeters
1905 births
1946 deaths
20th-century trumpeters
Jazz musicians from Louisiana
20th-century American male musicians
American male jazz musicians